FASH-ionably Late is a collaboration EP by American hip hop recording artists Fashawn and The Alchemist, released on December 18, 2014. The project contains seven original tracks, with Fashawn rapping over The Alchemist's production. The EP serves as a prelude to Fashawn's long-anticipated second solo album The Ecology, which was released on February 24, 2015 under Nas' Mass Appeal Records.

To celebrate the release of FASH-ionably Late, Grizzly Griptape (a division of streetwear brand Diamond Supply Co.) teamed up with Fashawn and The Alchemist to create a limited edition collaboration T-shirt; Grizzly's logo is featured in the artwork of the EP, as well as Fashawn wearing a Grizzly hoodie in the video for the track "Dreams."

Track listing 
All tracks produced by The Alchemist

References

External links
Fashawn Official Website  
Fashawn on Twitter 
Fashawn on Instagram 

Fashawn albums
2014 albums
Albums produced by the Alchemist (musician)